The Nanaimo Curling Club is a curling club located in Nanaimo, British Columbia. The club plays out of the Nanaimo Curling Centre on Wall Street in Bowen Park.

The club was founded in 1947 at the Nanaimo Civic Arena, though the club began regular curling play in 1949 on one sheet of ice. A four sheet curling rink was built in 1951 located immediately north of the current club site. A fifth sheet was added in 1953, at the same time the Ladies club was incorporated.  The club built an eight sheet club in 1969. In 2017, the club won the Travelers Curling Club Championship.

Provincial champions
The club has won a number of provincial curling titles over the years:

Women's
The club has won the women's provincial championships four times: 
1957: Margaret Fuller, Pat Good, Sylvia Koster, Edna Quinney
1961: Margaret Fuller, Sylvia Koster, Edna Quinney, Fernande Smith
1973: Karin Kaese, Shannon Blackburn, Loretta Ahlstrom, Donna Dunn
2018: Kesa Van Osch, Marika Van Osch, Kalia Van Osch, Amy Gibson

Junior Women's
2012: Kesa Van Osch, Kalia Van Osch, Marika Van Osch, Brooklyn Leitch
2014: Kalia Van Osch, Marika Van Osch, Sarah Daniels, Ashley Sanderson, Megan Daniels (shared with the Delta Curling Club)

Senior Women's
1988: Helen Elson, Mary Williams, Marj Tegart, Evelyn Provost
2012: Penny Shantz, Debbie Jones Walker, Deborah Pulak, Shirley Wong

Master Women's
2002: Jessie Whittam, Marj Fenske, Eileen Smith, Trudy Knelson

Junior Men's
1972: Rick Neff, Murray Norby, Brian Cann, Bob Smiley
1980: Stacey Coomber, Randy Thiessen, Jim Newlands, Mike Cameron
1983: Bob McIntosh, Alan Sutherland, Kevin Kelly, Greg Peachy

Senior Men's
1970: Don MacRae, Gene Koster, Bev Smiley, Doc Howden (Canadian Senior Champions)

Master Men's
1992:  Archie McIntosh, Gene Klymchuk, Glen Anderson, Norrie Nishio

Mixed
2016: Wes Craig, Kesa Van Osch, Miles Craig, Marika Van Osch (shared with the Kerry Park Curling Club)

External links
Official site

References

Curling clubs in Canada
Sport in Nanaimo
Curling clubs established in 1947
1947 establishments in British Columbia
Curling in British Columbia
Sports venues in British Columbia